Waverly is a historic home located at Croom in Prince George's County, Maryland.  The house, constructed in 1855, is a -story, two-part Italianate-style frame house. The casing of the principal entrance is a combination of both the Greek Revival and Italianate styles. Also on the property are two of the original outbuildings, a meathouse and a washhouse.

It was listed on the National Register of Historic Places in 1987.

References

External links
, including photo in 1986, at Maryland Historical Trust website

Houses completed in 1855
Houses in Prince George's County, Maryland
Italianate architecture in Maryland
Houses on the National Register of Historic Places in Maryland
National Register of Historic Places in Prince George's County, Maryland